John Burton Rix (March 24, 1882 – August 8, 1964) was an American football and basketball player and coach. He served as the head football coach at Austin College (1909–1910), Southwestern University (1914–1916), Southern Methodist University (1917–1921), the University of Miami (1929), compiling a career college football coaching record of 39–34–11. Rix was also the head basketball coach at the University of Texas at Austin (1911–1912) and at Southern Methodist (1917–1921), tallying a career college basketball mark of 29–37.

Early life
Rix was born on March 24, 1882 in Cincinnati, Ohio. He attended Dartmouth College, where he played on the football team as a halfback in 1905, and served as the basketball team captain for the 1903–04 and 1904–05 seasons. Rix graduated from Dartmouth with an A.B. degree in 1906. He was a member of the Pi Chapter of the Delta Kappa Epsilon fraternity and the Casque and Gauntlet. In 1910, he was teaching as an English instructor at Austin College.

Coaching career
In 1912, Rix became the head basketball coach at Texas, replacing W. E. Metzenthin, who had moved into the position of athletic director. Rix served in that capacity for one season and without pay. According to the student yearbook, the Cactus, he "took hold of the squad when it found itself without a leader and quickly demonstrated his ability to transform it into a quintet that was as good as any in the state." At Texas, he also served as an assistant football coach under Dave Allerdice from 1911 through 1913. After a 30–7 loss to Notre Dame in 1913, Rix wrote in The Alcalde:"I was asked to criticise the playing of our team in this game. Had we won I should perhaps have been willing to do so. As it is, there is no necessity for it, for our men themselves, you may be assured, are criticising themselves with a self-analysis, and sincerity and effectiveness that will do more for the development of football in Texas than a whole season of ordinary games."

From 1914 to 1916, he coached the football team and served as the athletic director at Southwestern University. In February 1917, he accepted the position as athletic director at Southern Methodist University in Dallas. At SMU, he served as the head basketball and football coach from 1917 to 1921. In 1921 he resigned as football coach after two games and was replaced by Bill Cunningham, also of Dartmouth, during a 1–6–1 campaign in 1921. In 1929, Rix became the second head football coach at the University of Miami, after a group of local businessmen financially backed the school. However, Rix left after one season as the Wall Street Crash of 1929 caused an end to the off-campus financing. He committed suicide by hanging in 1964.

Head coaching record

Football

Basketball

Notes

References

External links
 

1882 births
1964 deaths
American football halfbacks
American men's basketball coaches
American men's basketball players
Austin College faculty
Austin Kangaroos football coaches
Basketball coaches from Ohio
College men's basketball head coaches in the United States
Dartmouth Big Green football players
Dartmouth Big Green men's basketball players
Players of American football from Cincinnati
SMU Mustangs athletic directors
SMU Mustangs football coaches
SMU Mustangs men's basketball coaches
Southwestern Pirates athletic directors
Southwestern Pirates football coaches
Southwestern Pirates men's basketball coaches
Texas Longhorns football coaches
Texas Longhorns men's basketball coaches
Suicides by hanging in Texas